is a railway station in the city of Mino, Gifu Prefecture, Japan, operated by the third sector railway operator Nagaragawa Railway.

Lines

Station layout
Minoshi Station has one ground-level island platform connected to the station building by an underground passage. The station is staffed.

Platforms

Adjacent stations

|-
!colspan=5|Nagaragawa Railway

History
On November 10, 1954, the station was renamed to its present name. Operations were transferred from the Japan National Railway (JNR) to the Nagaragawa Railway on December 11, 1986.

Surrounding area
 Tōkai-Hokuriku Expressway
 Mino Historical Preservation District
 Mino Post Office

See also
 List of Railway Stations in Japan

References

External links

 

Railway stations in Japan opened in 1923
Railway stations in Gifu Prefecture
Stations of Nagaragawa Railway
Mino, Gifu